Zinc diphosphide (ZnP2) is an inorganic chemical compound. It is a red semiconductor solid with a band gap of 2.1 eV. It is one of the two compounds in the zinc-phosphorus system, the other being zinc phosphide (Zn3P2).

Synthesis and reactions
Zinc diphosphide can be prepared by the reaction of zinc with phosphorus.
2 Zn  +  P4   →  2 ZnP2

Structure
ZnP2 has a room-temperature tetragonal form that converts to a monoclinic form at around 990 °C. In both of these forms, there are chains of P atoms, helical in the tetragonal, semi-spiral in the monoclinic.

This compound is part of the Zn-Cd-P-As quaternary system and exhibit partial solid-solution with other binary compounds of the system.

Safety
ZnP2, like Zn3P2, is highly toxic due to the release of phosphine gas when the material reacts with gastric acid.

References

zinc
phosphide
II-V semiconductors
II-V compounds